Ned Raynolds is an American politician. He serves as a Democratic member for the Rockingham 39th district of the New Hampshire House of Representatives.

Life and career 
Raynolds attended United States Coast Guard Academy and Harvard Kennedy School of Government.

In November 2022, Raynolds defeated Sue Polidura in the general election for the Rockingham 39th district of the New Hampshire House of Representatives, winning 69 percent of the votes. He assumed office in December 2022.

References 

Living people
Year of birth missing (living people)
Place of birth missing (living people)
Democratic Party members of the New Hampshire House of Representatives
21st-century American politicians
Harvard Kennedy School alumni